Tok Pisin (Tok Pisin ), often referred to by English speakers as "New Guinea Pidgin" or simply Pidgin, is a creole language spoken throughout Papua New Guinea. It is an official language of Papua New Guinea and the most widely used language in the country. However, in parts of the southern provinces of Western, Gulf, Central, Oro, and Milne Bay, the use of Tok Pisin has a shorter history and is less universal, especially among older people. 

Between five and six million people use Tok Pisin to some degree, although not all speak it fluently. Many now learn it as a first language, in particular the children of parents or grandparents who originally spoke different languages (for example, a mother from Madang and a father from Rabaul). Urban families in particular, and those of police and defence force members, often communicate among themselves in Tok Pisin, either never gaining fluency in a local language or learning a local language as a second (or third) language, after Tok Pisin (and possibly English). Over the decades, Tok Pisin has increasingly overtaken Hiri Motu as the dominant lingua franca among town-dwellers. Perhaps one million people now use Tok Pisin as a primary language. Tok Pisin is slowly "crowding out" other languages of Papua New Guinea.

Name

 is derived from English "talk", but has a wider application, also meaning "word", "speech", or "language".  derives from the English word 'pidgin'; the latter, in turn, may originate in the word business, which is descriptive of the typical development and use of pidgins as inter-ethnic trade languages.

Papua New Guinean anglophones often refer to Tok Pisin as "Pidgin" when speaking English. This usage of "Pidgin" differs from the term "pidgin" as used in linguistics. Tok Pisin is not a pidgin in the latter sense, since it has become a first language for many people (rather than simply a lingua franca to facilitate communication with speakers of other languages). As such, it is considered a creole in linguistic terminology.

Classification

The Tok Pisin language is a result of Pacific Islanders intermixing, when people speaking numerous different languages were sent to work on plantations in Queensland and various islands (see South Sea Islander and blackbirding). The labourers began to develop a pidgin, drawing vocabulary primarily from English, but also from German, Malay, Portuguese and their own Austronesian languages (perhaps especially Kuanua, that of the Tolai people of East New Britain).

This English-based pidgin evolved into Tok Pisin in German New Guinea (where the German-based creole Unserdeutsch was also spoken). It became a widely used lingua franca and language of interaction between rulers and ruled, and among the ruled themselves who did not share a common vernacular. Tok Pisin and the closely related Bislama in Vanuatu and Pijin in the Solomon Islands, which developed in parallel, have traditionally been treated as varieties of a single Melanesian Pidgin English or "Neo-Melanesian" language. The flourishing of the mainly English-based Tok Pisin in German New Guinea (despite the language of the metropolitan power being German) is to be contrasted with Hiri Motu, the lingua franca of Papua, which was derived not from English but from Motu, the vernacular of the indigenous people of the Port Moresby area.

Official status
Along with English and Hiri Motu, Tok Pisin is one of the three official languages of Papua New Guinea. It is frequently the language of debate in the national parliament. Most government documents are produced in English, but public information campaigns are often partially or entirely in Tok Pisin. While English is the main language in the education system, some schools use Tok Pisin in the first three years of elementary education to promote early literacy.

Regional variations
There are considerable variations in vocabulary and grammar in various parts of Papua New Guinea, with distinct dialects in the New Guinea Highlands, the north coast of Papua New Guinea, and islands outside of New Guinea. For example, Pidgin speakers from Finschhafen speak rather quickly and often have difficulty making themselves understood elsewhere. The variant spoken on Bougainville and Buka is moderately distinct from that of New Ireland and East New Britain but is much closer to that than it is to the Pijin spoken in the rest of the Solomon Islands. 

Alphabet
The Tok Pisin alphabet contains 22 letters, five of which are vowels, and four digraphs. The letters are (vowels in bold):
a, b, d, e, f, g, h, i, k, l, m, n, o, p, r, s, t, u, v, w, y

The four digraphs note diphthongs, as well as certain consonants:

Phonology
Tok Pisin, like many pidgins and creoles, has a simpler phonology than the superstrate language. It has 17 consonants and 5 vowels. However, this varies with the local substrate languages and the level of education of the speaker. The following is the "core" phonemic inventory, common to virtually all varieties of Tok Pisin. More educated speakers, and/or those where the substrate language(s) have larger phoneme inventories, may have as many as 10 distinct vowels.

Nasal plus plosive offsets lose the plosive element in Tok Pisin e.g. English hand becomes Tok Pisin .

Consonants

Voiced plosives are pronounced by many speakers (especially of Melanesian backgrounds) as prenasalized plosives.
 In most Tok Pisin dialects, the phoneme  is pronounced as the alveolar tap or flap, .

Vowels
Tok Pisin has five pure vowels:

Grammar
But some verbs, such as  "eat", can be transitive without it. The present progressive tense is indicated by the word  – e.g. "He is eating".

The noun does not indicate number, though pronouns do.

It is also found on numerals and determiners:
Tok Pisin: 	 → Eng. "one"
Tok Pisin: 	 → Eng. "two"
Tok Pisin: 	→ Eng. "this bloke"

Pronouns show person, number, and clusivity. The paradigm varies depending on the local languages; dual number is common, while the trial is less so. The largest Tok Pisin pronoun inventory is,

Reduplication is very common in Tok Pisin. Sometimes it is used as a method of derivation; sometimes words just have it. Some words are distinguished only by reduplication:  "ship",  "sheep".

There are only two proper prepositions: 
 the genitive preposition  (etym. < Eng. belong), which is equivalent to "of", "from" and some uses of "for": e.g.  "your key";  "They are from Gordon's".
 the oblique preposition  (etym. < Eng. along), which is used for various other relations (such as locative or dative): e.g. . "We went to the black market".

Some phrases are used as prepositions, such as ', "in the middle of".

Several of these features derive from the common grammatical norms of Austronesian languages – although usually in a simplified form. Other features, such as word order, are however closer to English.

Sentences which have a 3rd person subject often put the word i immediately before the verb. This may or may not be written separate from the verb, occasionally written as a prefix. Although the word is thought to be derived from "he" or "is", it is not itself a pronoun or a verb but a grammatical marker used in particular constructions, e.g.,  is "car forbidden here", i.e., "no parking".

Tense and aspect
Tok Pisin: 
English: "And the prime minister spoke thus." (Romaine 1991: 629)

Continuative same tense is expressed through: verb + .
Tok Pisin: .
English: "He/She is sleeping." (ibid.: 631)

Completive or perfective aspect expressed through the word  (< Eng. finish):
Tok Pisin: 
English: "He had got out of the boat." (Mühlhäusler 1984: 462)

Transitive words are expressed through  (< Eng. him):
Tok Pisin: 
English: "Finish your story now!" (ibid.: 640)

Future is expressed through the word "" (< Eng. by and by):
Tok Pisin: 
English: "They will go to their rooms now." (Mühlhäusler 1991: 642)

Development of Tok Pisin

Tok Pisin is a language that developed out of regional dialects of the languages of the local inhabitants and English, brought into the country when English speakers arrived. There were four phases in the development of Tok Pisin that were laid out by Loreto Todd.
Casual contact between English speakers and local people developed a marginal pidgin.
Pidgin English was used between the local people. The language expanded from the users' mother tongue.
As the interracial contact increased, the vocabulary expanded according to the dominant language.
In areas where English was the official language, a depidginization occurred (Todd, 1990).

Tok Pisin is also known as a "mixed" language. This means that it consists of characteristics of different languages. Tok Pisin obtained most of its vocabulary from the English language (i.e., English is its lexifier). The origin of the syntax is a matter of debate. Hymes claims that the syntax is from the substratum languages—the languages of the local peoples. Derek Bickerton's analysis of creoles, on the other hand, claims that the syntax of creoles is imposed on the grammarless pidgin by its first native speakers: the children who grow up exposed to only a pidgin rather than a more developed language such as one of the local languages or English. In this analysis, the original syntax of creoles is in some sense the default grammar humans are born with.

Pidgins are less elaborated than non-Pidgin languages. Their typical characteristics found in Tok Pisin are:

A smaller vocabulary which leads to metaphors to supply lexical units:
Smaller vocabulary:
 = "election" (n) and "vote" (v)
 = "heavy" (adj) and "weight" (n)
Metaphors:
 (screw of the arm) = "elbow"
 (screw of the leg) = "knee" (Just  almost always indicates the knee. In liturgical contexts,  is "kneel.")
Periphrases:
 (literally "first child of Mrs Queen") = Prince Charles.
A reduced grammar: lack of copula, determiners; reduced set of prepositions, and conjunctions
In fact, the Tok Pisin  means "fish" (and usually has a sound closer to [], almost like the English word piss). English piss was reduplicated to keep it distinct: thus  means "urine" or "to urinate".
Likewise,  in Tok Pisin could have represented English ship, jib, jeep, sieve, or chief. In fact, it means "ship".

Vocabulary
Many words in the Tok Pisin language are derived from English (with Australian influences), indigenous Melanesian languages, and German (part of the country was under German rule until 1919). Some examples:
 as = "bottom", "cause", "beginning" (from ass/arse). As ples bilong em = "his birthplace". As bilong diwai = "the stump of a tree".
 bagarap(im) = "broken", "to break down" (from bugger up). The word is commonly used, with no vulgar undertone, in Tok Pisin and even in Papua New Guinea English.
 bagarap olgeta = "completely broken"
 balus = "bird" or more specifically a pigeon or dove (an Austronesian loan word); by extension "aeroplane"
 belhat = "angry" (lit. "belly hot")
 belo = "bell", as in belo bilong lotu = "church bell". By extension "lunch" or "midday break" (from the bell rung to summon diners to the table). A fanciful derivation has been suggested from the "bellows" of horns used by businesses to indicate the beginning of the lunch hour, but this seems less likely than the straightforward derivation.
 bensin = "petrol/gasoline" (from German )
 bilong wanem? = "why?"
 braun = "brown"
 buai = "betelnut"
 bubu = "grandparent", any elderly relation; also "grandchild". Possibly from Hiri Motu, where it is a familiar form of "tubu", as in "tubuna" or "tubugu".
 diwai = "tree", "wood", "plant", "stick", etc.
 gat bel = "pregnant" (lit. "has belly"; pasin bilong givim bel = "fertility")
 gras = "hair" (from grass)
 gude = "hello" (from g'day)
 gut = "good"
 (h)amamas = "happy"
 hap = a piece of, as in hap diwai = a piece of wood (from half)
 hapsait = "the other side" (from half side)
 hap ret = "purple" (from half red)
 haus = "house" or "building" (from German  and/or English house)
 hausboi/hausmeri = "a male/female domestic servant"; haus boi can also mean "servants quarters"
 haus kaikai = restaurant ("house [of] food")
 haus moni = "bank" ("house [of] money")
 haus sik = "hospital" ("house [of] sick")
 haus dok sik = "animal hospital" ("house [of] dog sick")
 haus karai = "place of mourning" ("house [of] cry")
 sit haus (vulgar) = "toilet" ("shit house"), also:
 liklik haus = "toilet"
 smol haus = "toilet/bathroom" ("small house")
 haus tambaran = "traditional Sepik-region house with artifacts of ancestors or for honoring ancestors; tambaran means "ancestor spirit" or "ghost"
 hevi = "heavy", "problem". Em i gat bigpela hevi = "he has a big problem".
 hukim pis = "catch fish" (from hook)
 kaikai = "food", "eat", "to bite" (Austronesian loan word)
 kaikai bilong moningtaim = "breakfast"
 kaikai bilong nait = "dinner/supper"
 kakaruk = "chicken" (probably onomatapoetic, from the crowing of the rooster)
 kamap = "arrive", "become" (from come up)
 kisim = "get", "take" (from get them)
 lotu = "church", "worship" from Fijian, but sometimes sios is used for "church"
 magani = "wallaby"
 bikpela magani = "kangaroo" ("big wallaby")
 mangi/manki = "small boy"; by extension, "young man" (probably from the English jocular/affectionate usage monkey, applied to mischievous children, although a derivation from the German , meaning "little man", has also been suggested)
 manmeri = "people" (from man, "man", and meri, "woman")
 maski = "it doesn't matter", "don't worry about it" (probably from German  = "it doesn't matter")
 maus gras = "moustache" ("mouth grass")
 meri = "woman" (from the English name Mary); also "female", e.g., bulmakau meri (lit. "bull-cow female") = cow.
 olgeta = "all" (from all together)
 olsem wanem = "what?", "what's going on?" (literally "like what"?); sometimes used as an informal greeting, similar to what's up? in English
 palopa - homosexual man, or transexual woman
 pisin = "bird" (from pigeon). (The homophony of this word with the name of the language has led to a limited association between the two; Mian speakers, for example, refer to Tok Pisin as wan weng, literally "bird language".)
 pasim = "close", "lock" (from fasten)
 pasim maus = "shut up", "be quiet", i.e. yu pasim maus, literally "you close mouth" = "shut up!"
 paul = "wrong", "confused", i.e. em i paul = "he is confused" (from English foul)
 pikinini = "child", ultimately from Portuguese-influenced Lingua franca; cf. English pickaninny
 raskol = "thief, criminal" (from rascal)
 raus, rausim (rausim is the transitive form) = "get out, throw out, remove" (from German  meaning "out")
 rokrok = "frog" (probably onomatopoeic)
 sapos = "if" (from suppose)
 save = "know", "to do habitually" (ultimately from Portuguese-influenced Lingua franca, cf. English savvy)
 sit = "remnant" (from shit)
 solwara = "ocean" (from salt water)
 sop = "soap"; also
 sop bilong tut = "toothpaste"
 sop bilong gras = "shampoo"
 stap = "stay", "be (somewhere)", "live" (from stop)
 susa = "sister", though nowadays very commonly supplanted by sista. Some Tok Pisin speakers use susa for a sibling of the opposite gender, while a sibling of the same gender as the speaker is a b(a)rata.
 susu = "milk, breasts" (from Malay susu)
 tambu = "forbidden", but also "in-laws" (mother-in-law, brother-in-law, etc.) and other relatives whom one is forbidden to speak to, or mention the name of, in some PNG customs (from tabu or tambu in various Austronesian languages, the origin of Eng. taboo)
 tasol = "only, just"; "but" (from that's all)
 Tok Inglis = "English language"
 wanpela = "one", "a" (indefinite article).

Example text
Article 1 of the Universal Declaration of Human Rights in Tok Pisin:

Article 1 of the Universal Declaration of Human Rights in English:
All human beings are born free and equal in dignity and rights. They are endowed with reason and conscience and should act towards one another in a spirit of brotherhood.

Citations

General references 
 
 
 
 
 
 
 Volker, C.A. (2008). Papua New Guinea Tok Pisin English Dictionary. South Melbourne: Oxford University Press. 
Mühlhäusler, Peter., Thomas Edward Dutton, and Suzanne Romaine. Tok Pisin Texts from the Beginning to the Present. Philadelphia, PA: John Benjamins, 2003.

Notes

Further reading
 Throwim Way Leg by Tim Flannery

External links

 Tok Pisin Translation, Resources, and Discussion Offers Tok Pisin translator, vocabulary, and discussion groups.
 Tok Pisin (New Guinea Pidgin) English Bilingual Dictionary
 Tok Pisin phrasebook on Wikivoyage
 A bibliography of Tok Pisin dictionaries, phrase books and study guides
 Revising the Mihalic Project , a collaborative internet project to revise and update Fr. Frank Mihalic's Grammar and Dictionary of Neo-Melanesian. An illustrated online dictionary of Tok Pisin.
 Tok Pisin background, vocabulary, sounds, and grammar, by Jeff Siegel
 Radio Australia Tok Pisin service
 Tok Pisin Radio on Youtube
 Buk Baibel long Tok Pisin (The Bible in Tok Pisin)
 Eukarist Anglican liturgy of Holy Communion in Tok Pisin
 Pidgin/English Dictionary as spoken in Port Moresby compiled by Terry D. Barhost and Sylvia O'Dell-Barhost.
 Tokpisin Grammar Workbook for English Speakers. A Practical Approach to Learning the Sentence Structure of Melanesian Pidgin (or Tokpisin).
 Robert Eklund's Tok Pisin Page – with recorded dialogs, children's ditties and a hymn (alternative address)
 Tok Pisin Swadesh List by Rosetta Project
 Audio and video recordings of a Tok Pisin event. Traditional "house cry"/"kisim sori na kam" ceremony for big man Paul Ine. Archived with Kaipuleohone

English-based pidgins and creoles
Languages of Papua New Guinea
Subject–verb–object languages